Dale or Dalekvam is the administrative centre of Vaksdal municipality, in Vestland county, Norway. The village lies along the European route E16, the Bergen Line (and Dale Station), and the river Daleelva. The small village of Dalegarden at the southern end of Dale is included in the "urban area" of Dale.

Dale Church is located in the village.  The village is also the site of the international Dale of Norway company which manufactures wool sweaters and outdoor jackets.  There is also a textile mill and other small industries. The newspaper VaksdalPosten has been published in Dale since 1987.

References

Vaksdal
Villages in Vestland